Bradley Michael Bridgewater (born March 29, 1973) is an American former competition swimmer who won the gold medal in the men's 200-meter backstroke at the 1996 Atlanta Olympics.

Bridgewater attended Lake Mary High School in Lake Mary, Florida, and was coached by 1972 Olympic gold medalist Fred Tyler.  In college, he swam for the Texas Longhorns swimming and diving team of the University of Texas from 1992 to 1994, then transferred to the University of Southern California (USC).  Under Trojans coach Mark Schubert, Bridgewater earned 1995 and 1996 All-America honors in the 100- and 200-meter backstroke.

At the 1996 Summer Olympics in Atlanta, Bridgewater won the gold medal in men's 200-meter backstroke with a time of 1:58.54, beating fellow American and rival Tripp Schwenk by .45 seconds.

Bridgewater currently serves as vice-president for Dallas, Texas investment management firm PHH Investments.

See also
 List of Olympic medalists in swimming (men)
 List of University of Southern California people
 List of University of Texas at Austin alumni

References
 
 Central Florida Olympians
 Bridgewater: backstroke times since 1996

1973 births
Living people
American male backstroke swimmers
Olympic gold medalists for the United States in swimming
Pan American Games gold medalists for the United States
People from Lake Mary, Florida
Sportspeople from Seminole County, Florida
Swimmers at the 1991 Pan American Games
Swimmers at the 1995 Pan American Games
Swimmers at the 1996 Summer Olympics
Swimmers from Florida
Texas Longhorns men's swimmers
USC Trojans men's swimmers
Medalists at the FINA World Swimming Championships (25 m)
Medalists at the 1996 Summer Olympics
Pan American Games medalists in swimming
Goodwill Games medalists in swimming
Competitors at the 1998 Goodwill Games
Medalists at the 1995 Pan American Games
20th-century American people
21st-century American people